The 1965–66 NBA season was the Detroit Pistons' 18th season in the NBA and its ninth season in the city of Detroit.  The team played at Cobo Arena in Detroit.

The Pistons struggled on the season, finishing 22-58 (.275), 5th in the Western Division and with the worst record in the NBA.  The team was led on the season by guard Eddie Miles (19.6 ppg, NBA All-Star) and player-coach Dave DeBusschere (16.4 ppg, 11.6 rpg, NBA All-Star).  Rookie guard Tom Van Arsdale (10.5 ppg, NBA First-Team All-Rookie) added to the cause.  Adding insult on the year, two Baltimore Bullets, Don Ohl and Bailey Howell, made the NBA All-Star game, having been traded the year prior by the Pistons, while 1964-65 Pistons All-Star Terry Dischinger, acquired in that trade, was now serving in the United States Army.

Roster

Regular season

Season standings

Record vs. opponents

Game log

Awards and records
Tom Van Arsdale, NBA All-Rookie Team 1st Team

References

Detroit Pistons seasons
Detroit
Detroit Pistons
Detroit Pistons